Maribor Synagogue is a former synagogue and current museum in the city of Maribor, Slovenia. Located in what was the center of the medieval Maribor ghetto Židovska ulica ("Jewish Street"), it is one of the oldest preserved synagogues in Europe, and one of only two left in Slovenia; the other being the Lendava Synagogue. It once functioned as the centre of the medieval Jewish community in Maribor, among the most prominent in the Eastern Alps-area.

History

First mentioned in 1354, the synagogue is thought to have been built sometime in the late 13th century. Located next to the city walls, it was part of a complex that included a Jewish cemetery, rabbinical residence, and Talmudic school. A fortified tower nearby - part of the walls themselves - was known as the Židovski stolp ("Jewish Tower"), while a building housing ritual baths stood outside the walls on the Drava riverbank.

At points throughout its history, the synagogue served as a temporary seat of the Supreme Rabbinate of Styria, Carinthia and Krain. In 1497, the Jews of Maribor were expelled, scattering all over Europe, especially Italy. After the expulsion, the synagogue was in 1501 turned into a Catholic church, the Church of All Saints. The former rabbi's residence to the west of the main building became a curate office, while another, smaller building on the eastern side housed the sexton.

In 1785, during the anticlerical reforms of Joseph II, the church was confiscated, deconsecrated, and converted into a military warehouse. It served in this capacity until 1811, when it was sold to private owners for use as a merchant storage, a wine cellar, a brush factory, an art studio, and an apartment house, which it remained until the 1980s.

Following several years of renovations, taking place from 1992 until 2000, including a reconstruction of the late Gothic sanctuary, the building opened in  2001 as a museum and cultural-exhibition venue devoted to the history of the Jewish community of Maribor, and of Slovenia. The site was initially administered by the Regional Museum of Maribor. Since 2011 it is an independent public institution under the name od Center of Jewish Cultural Heritage Synagogue Maribor. Since 2015 the synagogue is labeled a Cultural monument of State significance in Slovenia.

See also
History of the Jews in Slovenia
Lendava Synagogue

References

External links 

14th-century synagogues
Buildings and structures in Maribor
Former synagogues in Slovenia
History museums in Slovenia
Jewish Slovenian history
Synagogues preserved as museums
Synagogue